Louis Rupprecht (December 27, 1925 – April 5, 2000) was an American speed skater. He competed in two events at the 1948 Winter Olympics.

References

1925 births
2000 deaths
American male speed skaters
Olympic speed skaters of the United States
Speed skaters at the 1948 Winter Olympics
Sportspeople from St. Louis